Klymene (minor planet designation: 104 Klymene) is a large, dark Themistian asteroid that was discovered by J. C. Watson on September 13, 1868, and named after one of the many Clymenes in Greek mythology. It is orbiting the Sun with a period of 5.60 years and an eccentricity of 0.16. The orbital plane is inclined by 2.8° to the plane of the ecliptic. It is classified as a C-type asteroid, indicating it probably has a carbonaceous composition. The spectra indicates the presence of aqueous-altered minerals on the surface based upon a sharp feature at a wavelength of 3 μm, and, as of 2015, is the only member of the Themis family found to show this absorption.

Based upon measurements made using adaptive optics at the W. M. Keck Observatory, this object may have a bi-lobed shape with a length of 163 ± 3 km and width of 103 ± 5 km, for an average dimension of 133 km. This asteroid is located near the region of the Themis family but itself considered a background asteroid using HCM-analysis. It is listed as a member of the Hecuba group of asteroids that orbit near the 2:1 mean-motion resonance with Jupiter.

References

External links 
 
 

000104
000104
000104
Discoveries by James Craig Watson
Named minor planets
18680913